Slater is an English surname derived from the occupation of a slater, a tradesman who works with slate.

Some notable individuals and fictional characters with the surname include:

In arts and entertainment
Christian Slater (born 1969), American actor
David Slater (born 1962), American singer-songwriter
 David Slater, author of Killing for Culture
 David J. Slater, British nature photographer known for monkey selfies
Glenn Slater (born 1968), American lyricist
Gordon Slater (carillonneur) (born 1950), Canadian bassoonist, conductor and organist
Gordon Archbold Slater (1896–1979), English cathedral organist
Harrison Slater, American writer, pianist, and educator
Helen Slater (born 1963), American film actor and singer-songwriter
James T. Slater, American songwriter
Jason Slater (1971–2020), American record producer
J. D. Slater (born 1955), filmmaker and composer 
John Slater (actor) (1916–1975), English actor
John Slater (musician), British heavy metal guitarist with Rise to Addiction and Blaze Bayley
Joseph Slater, Jr. (1782–1837), British portrait painter and draughtsman
Joseph Slater Sr. (1750–1805), British painter, father of Joseph Slater Jr.
Lorna Slater, Canadian-born Scottish politician
Luke Slater (born 1968), British musician
Mary Jo Slater (born 1946), American casting director and producer
Montagu Slater (1902–1956), English writer
Nigel Slater (born 1958), British food writer, journalist and broadcaster
Peter Slater (sculptor) (1809–1860), Scottish sculptor and portrait artist
Robert Slater (1943–2014), American author and journalist
Rodney Slater (musician) (born 1941), with Bonzo Dog Doo-Dah Band
Sharon Slater, Irish historian and author
Simon Slater, British actor
 Stuart Slater (born 1945), musician from Liverpool also known as Stu James, see Stephanie de Sykes

In politics
Bill Slater (1890–1960), Australian lawyer, politician and diplomat
Courtenay Slater (1933–2017), Chief Economist for the US Department of Commerce
Fred J. Slater (1885–1943), New York politician
George A. Slater (1867–1937), New York politician and judge
Harry Slater (politician) (1863–1936), Canadian politician
Howard R. Slater (1917-1987), American politician and lawyer
Jack Slater (politician) (1927–1997), in South Australian parliament
James H. Slater (1826–1899), United States Representative and Senator from Oregon
John Slater (British politician) (1889–1935), British Conservative MP for Eastbourne
John Slater (Canadian politician) (1952–2015), Member of the Legislative Assembly of British Columbia
John Slater (New Zealand politician), with New Zealand National Party, later Citizens and Ratepayers Now
John J. Slater Jr. (1925–1998), American lawyer and politician in Massachusetts
Joseph Slater, Baron Slater (1904–1977), British Labour Party politician
Kent Slater (born 1945), Illinois politician and judge
Richard Slater (1634–1699), English politician
Rodney E. Slater (born 1955), United States Secretary of Transportation
Samuel S. Slater (1870–1916), New York politician
Thomas C. Slater (1945–2009) American politician

In science and academia
Don Slater (born 1954), British sociologist
Edward Slater (1917–2016), aka Bill Slater, Australian biochemist at University of Amsterdam
Eliot Slater (1904–1983), British psychiatrist and eugenicist
Florence Wells Slater (1864–1941), American entomologist and schoolteacher
Henry H. Slater (1851–1934), British priest and naturalist
James Kirkwood Slater (1900–1965), British neurologist
John C. Slater (1900–1976), American physicist and theoretical chemist
John Samuel Slater, British professor of civil engineering
Lauren Slater (born 1963), American psychologist and writer
Lucy Joan Slater, British mathematician
Noel Slater, British mathematician and astronomer
Philip Slater, American actor, writer and sociologist
Rebeccah Slater, British neuroscientist and academic
Terry Slater (geographer), British academic
William Kershaw Slater (1893–1970), president of the Royal Institute of Chemistry

In sports
Allana Slater (born 1984), Australian artistic gymnast
Austin Slater (born 1992), American professional baseball player
Ben Slater (born 1991), English cricketer
Bert Slater (1936–2006), Scottish football player
Bill Slater (footballer) (1927–2018), English footballer
Billy Slater (born 1983), Australian rugby league player
Billy Slater (footballer) (1858–?), English footballer 
Dan Slater (born 1976), New Zealand sailor
 Dave Slater, see List of Canada national rugby union players
 David Slater, see 1976 IAAF World Cross Country Championships
Dick Slater (1951–2018), American professional wrestler
Duke Slater (1898–1966), American football player
George Slater (born 1864), English footballer
Gordon Slater (rugby union) (born 1971), former rugby player from New Zealand
Harry Slater (rugby league), rugby union and rugby league footballer of the 1900s and 1910s
Heath Slater (born 1983), wrestler
Henry Slater (cricketer, born 1855) (1855–1916), English cricketer
Jackie Slater (born 1954), American football player
Jim Slater (footballer) (1884–1970), Australian rules footballer
Jim Slater (ice hockey) (born 1982), American ice hockey center
John Slater (cricketer) (1795–?), English cricketer
John Slater (figure skater) (1935–1989), British figure skater and ice dancer
Keith Slater (born 1936), Australian cricketer
Kelly Slater (born 1972), American professional surfer
Matthew Slater (born 1985), American professional football player
Michael Slater (born 1970), Australian cricketer
Nicky Slater (born 1958) British former ice figure skater
Peter Slater (ice hockey) (born 1948), Canadian ice hockey player
Rashawn Slater (born 1999), American football player
Reggie Slater (born 1970), American professional basketball player
Rob Slater (1960–1995), American mountaineer
Robbie Slater (born 1964), Australian soccer player
Stephanie Slater, (born 1991) British swimmer
Stuart Slater (born 1969), British soccer player
William Slater (cricketer) (1790–1852), English cricketer
William Slater (swimmer) (born 1940), Canadian swimmer
Willie J. Slater, American football coach and player

In other fields
Bill Slater (disambiguation), several people, including (not above),
Bill Slater (broadcaster) (1902–1965), American educator, sports announcer, and radio/television personality
 Bill Slater, (Edward Slater 1917–2016), also known as Australian biochemist 
David Slater (disambiguation), several people, including (not above)
David A. Slater (1866–1938), English classicist, academic and schoolmaster
David W. Slater (1921–2010), Canadian economist, civil servant and President of York University
Frank O. Slater (born 1920), United States Navy sailor
Gordon Slater (disambiguation), several people
Harry Slater (disambiguation), several people
Herman Slater (1935–1992), American occultist, writer and shop-owner
James Slater (disambiguation), several people, including (not above)
James Anderson Slater (1896–1925), British World War I flying ace
Jim Slater (disambiguation), several people, including (not above)
Jim Slater (accountant) (1929–2015), British investor and business writer
Jim Slater (trade unionist) (1923–1993), Communist and British trade union leader
Jock Slater (born 1938), British admiral
John Slater (disambiguation), several people, including (not above)
John Slater (industrialist) (1776–1843), father of John Fox Slater, brother and partner of Samuel Slater
John Fox Slater (1815–1884), American philanthropist, son of John Slater (industrialist)
John Slater & Co. of Forestdale, Rhode Island
John Slater (trade unionist) (1920s-1974), British trade union leader
Joseph Slater (disambiguation), several people, including (not above)
Joseph E. Slater (1922–2002), American economist, president and chief executive of the Aspen Institute
Michael Atwell Slater, Royal Navy Officer and hydrographic surveyor
Michael Slater (general), Australian army major general
Oscar Slater, German-born gangster in Scotland, wrongly convicted of murder
Peter Slater (disambiguation), several people, including (not above)
Peter Slater (ornithologist) (born 1932), Australian wildlife artist and photographer
Ralph Slater, British millwright
Rodney Slater (disambiguation), several people
Samuel Slater (1768–1835), American industrialist
Steven Slater, American flight attendant
Timothy C. Slater, American businessman
William Slater (disambiguation), several people
William Slater (architect) (1819–1872), English architect
William A. Slater (1857–1919), American businessman, art collector, and philanthropist

Fictional characters
DCI Roy Slater, a character on the British TV series Only Fools and Horses
A.C. Slater, a character on the TV series Saved by the Bell
 Ron Slater, a character in the 1993 movie Dazed and Confused
 Jack Slater, the main character of the 1993 movie Last Action Hero
 Slater, a Central Intelligence Agency operative on the animated TV series Archer voiced by actor Christian Slater
 Nick Slater, a character on the British TV series The Bill
 Michelle Slater, a character in the TV series Community
 Dan Slater, the main character in the 1967 film The Double Man

EastEnders
Several characters on the TV series EastEnders:
Slater family (EastEnders)
Alison Slater
Amy Slater
Bev Slater
Charlie Slater
Harry Slater (EastEnders)
Hayley Slater
Jean Slater
Kat Slater
Kyle Slater
Lynne Slater
Sean Slater
Stacey Slater
Viv Slater
Zoe Slater

Loving
Several characters on the TV series Loving:
Garth Slater
June Slater

English-language surnames
Occupational surnames
English-language occupational surnames